Eilat's Coral World Underwater Observatory is a public aquarium, park and conservation center located in Eilat, Israel. It is the biggest public aquarium in Israel, and it hosts over 800 species. It was founded in 1974 and was the first of its kind. The park and aquarium is located to the south of Eilat's Coral Beach nature reserve.

History 
The park was founded in 1974 by the zoologist and marine biologist David Friedman. The idea of the observatory was planned in 1972, it took careful planning to create the observatory without harming the natural environment. The observatory was built completely on land, which was then flooded with water from the Red Sea using armory parts and other metals. The base of the observatory was connected to large iron chains, and after the observatory was placed many corals were planted on and around the observatory in order to repair the damage that was done during the making of the observatory. The coral reef around the observatory flourished and became a major feeding spot for many fish and other marine wildlife, both carnivorous and herbivore. To preserve the biodiversity of the Gulf of Eilat all the water returns to the sea in an ecologically neutral condition. Water comes through the system of aquariums, reaches thousands of sea creatures and then is filtered to eliminate all mechanical and biological contamination.

Exhibits

Entrance aquarium 

The entrance aquarium is a medium cubic aquarium in the entrance square of the park. It features several species such as corals, butterflyfishes, crabs, and more. The aquarium (as well as in all the other exhibits at the park) is connected directly to Red Sea, and so the water is pumped and replaced constantly with Red Sea water, and so fully natural conditions are kept within the aquarium.

Red Sea circular exhibit 

The Red Sea Circular Exhibit is a 360 degrees exhibit in which the visitors stand in the middle  and are surrounded by 360,000 litres of water featuring a complete natural ecosystem. The exhibit features corals, herbivorous fish, carnivorous fish, parasites, crabs, shrimp and more, all living in one functioning ecosystem. All the animals are fed daily thus ensuring they don't harm each other. The Circular exhibit is used for research about the unique ecosystem of coral reefs. The water in the circular exhibit are pumped from 42 meters deep in the Red Sea and are circulated 24/7.

Turtle and stingray pools 

The Turtle and Stingray pools  are three shallow (3.5 meter deep) pools, which exhibit hawksbill sea turtle, green sea turtles, and spotted eagle rays.  In the middle of one of the pools there's a small sand island for female turtles to lay their eggs on. When the eggs hatch, the baby sea turtles are taken into a small aquarium, where they are safe from predators and where they get food and vaccinations. When they grow they are transferred to bigger aquarium, and finally when they are two years old with very high chance to survive in the wild they are released into the ocean. The Underwater Observatory's turtle conservation program is one of the leading programs in the field and so far has released hundreds of turtles back to nature.

Rare fish exhibit 
The Rare Fish Exhibit is a large exhibit separated into three rooms which exhibits rare fauna and flora of the red sea in medium-sized aquariums. The first two rooms feature animals such as lionfishes, Red Sea clownfish, star fish, rare corals, moray eels, lobsters, sea horses and more. In the exhibit there is a total of 250 species, featured in 35 medium aquariums. Some of the animals in the exhibit are endemic to the Red Sea, and are in the observatory park for means of breeding and conservation. The sea horse conservation program is a success, and since 2002 thousands sea horses has been released into the Red Sea. Despite the animals the aquariums are designed to mimic the animals' natural habitat and thus educate visitors about different marine biomes and habitats.

The third room of the exhibit is the nocturnal room. The nocturnal room features various nocturnal animals such as flashlight fish, squids, jellyfishes, crabs and more. The exhibit also features active and awake corals - as corals are nocturnal animals. Most of the animals in the exhibit are capable of bioluminescence.

Amazon hut 
The Amazon Hut is a rainforest theme exhibit featuring both aquatic and land-based wildlife from South America, such as caimans, electric eels, piranhas, arowanas, dart frogs, lizards, tarantulas, and more. It is used to explain fresh water ecosystems, and the importance of rainforests.

"Shark World" 
The "Shark World" exhibit is a huge exhibit containing  of water, and featuring 20 shark species, rays and corals. The exhibit has a huge viewing window, an underwater tunnel and an interactive explanations area with educational stations about the importance of sharks and the threats that make sharks endangered.

The underwater observatory

Coral 2000 
Coral 2000 is an underwater observatory in Eilat. The Coral 2000 is a glass-bottomed boat. This unique ship was built in Australia in 1994 and made its way to Eilat in 1999. The Coral 2000 offers beautiful and fascinating views of Eilat's coral reef. A Coral 2000 cruise lasts about 35 minutes.

Additional attractions and activities

Oceanarium 
The Oceanarium is a 4D movie documenting the life of sharks in the wild, and in particular, the rare whale shark.

Additional shops 
In addition to the animal exhibits, educational stations and daily activities, the park hosts several shops including two for jewelry, one for photography, a diving shop and a gift shop. There are also three food kiosks, a coffee house and a "Shark Bay" restaurant on site.

References

External links 
 

Eilat Marine Park on zooinstitutes.com(deez)

Eilat
Zoos in Israel
Coral World International's Public Aquariums
Observatories